Merrick State Park is a  Wisconsin state park on the Mississippi River north of Fountain City.  The park is bordered by the lands and waters of the Upper Mississippi River National Wildlife and Fish Refuge.

Activities and amenities
Camping: The park has three campgrounds (North, South, Island) with a total of 65 individual campsites.
Boating: Two ramps accommodate both motorized and non-motorized boaters and fishermen.
The park also has picnic grounds and a playground, hunting, cross-country skiing, and snowshoeing.

References

External links

 Merrick State Park Wisconsin Department of Natural Resources

Protected areas of Buffalo County, Wisconsin
Protected areas on the Mississippi River
State parks of Wisconsin
Protected areas established in 1932
1932 establishments in Wisconsin